Paige Niemann (born 2003/2004) is an American social media personality. In 2019, she went viral on the video sharing app TikTok for her resemblance to the American singer, songwriter, and actress Ariana Grande.

Early life
Paige Niemann was born in 2003 or 2004. She is from California, United States, and was home-schooled. Niemann is half Sicilian and half German. Niemann stated that she was told she resembled American singer, songwriter, and actress Ariana Grande several years before she went viral on TikTok.

Career
At the age of twelve, Niemann started posting selfies and videos of herself dressed as Grande on musical.ly (now TikTok). Beginning in 2017, she took a hiatus from the app and subsequently returned in two years later in 2019. That year, Niemann went viral and many TikTok users dubbed her Grande's doppelgänger; by November, she had garnered nearly two million followers. Niemann's videos feature her with hair, brows, eyeliner, and makeup—which she refines using online makeup tutorials—that is similar to Grande's; she also emulates that singer's mannerisms. Grande herself responded to a video in which Niemann—dressed as a 2019 version of the singer—lip-synced to dialogue by Cat Valentine—whom Grande portrayed from 2010 until 2014 in the Nickelodeon series Victorious and Sam & Cat—saying "it's definitely bizarre seeing people blend the two worlds". In September 2022, Niemann was criticized for starting an OnlyFans; fans found her account misleading as her posts and profile picture featured her dressed as Grande.

References

External links

Living people
2000s births
21st-century American women
American people of German descent
American TikTokers
People from California
People of Sicilian descent
Social media influencers